North West Mounted Police is a 1940 American epic-western film produced and directed by Cecil B. DeMille and starring Gary Cooper and Madeleine Carroll. Written by Alan Le May, Jesse Lasky Jr., and C. Gardner Sullivan, and based on the 1938 novel The Royal Canadian Mounted Police by R. C. Fetherstonhaugh, the film is about a Texas Ranger who joins forces with the North-West Mounted Police to put down a rebellion in the north-west prairies of Canada. The supporting cast features Paulette Goddard, Preston Foster, Robert Preston, Akim Tamiroff, Lon Chaney Jr. and George Bancroft. Regis Toomey, Richard Denning, Rod Cameron, and Robert Ryan make brief appearances in the film playing small roles.

North West Mounted Police was DeMille's first film in Technicolor. The film premiered on October 21, 1940 in Regina, Saskatchewan, and was released in the United States on October 22, 1940 by Paramount Pictures. The film received an Academy Award for Best Film Editing (Anne Bauchens).

Plot
Texas Ranger Dusty Rivers is sent to Canada in pursuit of outlaw Jacques Corbeau, arriving in the midst of the 1885 Riel Rebellion. Dusty meets nurse April Logan and is attracted to her, causing rivalry with another suitor, Canadian Mountie Sergeant Jim Brett.

Meanwhile, April's brother, Mountie Ronnie Logan, is madly in love with Corbeau's daughter, Louvette. These feelings are fully reciprocated, despite them being on opposite sides.

Louvette learns that the rebels plan to attack a lookout post guarded by Ronnie and then ambush a Mounties column which is trying to seize an abandoned store of ammunition which would be invaluable to the rebels. By crushing the column, the rebels will demonstrate to wavering Indian forces that the rebellion is worth joining. To keep Ronnie safely out of the ambush, of which he is unaware, Louvette persuades him to leave his post for an hour, and then has him confined by Indians.
Dusty helps the Mounties to mount a rearguard action against the ambushers. Sergeant Jim then leads a small detachment from the fort to the Indian camp where he persuades them to allow him to arrest Corbeau. Dusty tracks down Louvette's hideout and convinces Ronnie to surrender to face a desertion charge, but Ronnie is killed in a case of mistaken identity.

Afterwards, Dusty accepts April’s decision to stay with Jim and returns to Texas.

Cast
As appearing in North West Mounted Police, (main roles and screen credits identified):

 Gary Cooper as Texas Ranger Dusty Rivers
 Madeleine Carroll as April Logan
 Paulette Goddard as Louvette Corbeau
 Preston Foster as Sergeant Jim Brett
 Robert Preston as Ronnie Logan
 George Bancroft as Jacques Corbeau
 Lynne Overman as Tod McDuff
 Akim Tamiroff as Dan Duroc
 Walter Hampden as Big Bear
 Lon Chaney Jr. as Shorty
 Montagu Love as Inspector Cabot
 Francis McDonald as Louis Riel
 George E. Stone as Johnny Pelang
 Willard Robertson as Supt. Harrington
 Regis Toomey as Constable Jerry Moore
 Richard Denning as Constable Thornton
 Douglas Kennedy as Constable Carter
 Robert Ryan as Constable Dumont
 Ralph Byrd as Constable Ackroyd
 Rod Cameron as Constable Underhill
 Chief Thundercloud as Wandering Spirit
 David Dunbar as Vitale
 Cecil B. DeMille as Narrator (uncredited) 
 Noble Johnson as Indian (uncredited)
 Paul Newlan as Indian (uncredited)
 Emory Parnell as George Higgins (uncredited)

Production
Due to budget restrictions, North West Mounted Police was filmed at sound stages at the Paramount lot as well as on location in Oregon and California, even though the film was based on a real life incident in Saskatchewan, Canada.  Principal photography began on March 9, 1940. Although Gary Cooper stars, the lead role was originally given to Joel McCrea, on contract at that time, but Cooper traded roles so that McCrea could star in Foreign Correspondent (1940).  DeMille narrated portions of the story, a practice he followed in all of his Technicolor films.

Reception

Critical response
In homage to the historical region portrayed in North West Mounted Police, the world premiere  for the film took place on October 21, 1940, in Regina, Saskatchewan, Canada. The film became Paramount's biggest box-office hit of 1940 and garnered some favourable contemporary reviews from critics, as well. Variety noted: "... scripters weave a story which has its exciting moments, a reasonable and convincing romance ..."
Later reviews were much less complimentary. Leonard Maltin called it "DeMille at his most ridiculous ... [a] superficial tale of Texas Ranger searching for fugitive in Canada. Much of outdoor action filmed on obviously indoor sets." North West Mounted Police was listed in the 1978 book The Fifty Worst Films of All Time (1978).

Awards and nominations

Notes

References

Bibliography

 Arce, Hector. Gary Cooper:  An Intimate Biography. New York: Bantam Books, 1980, First edition 1979. .
 Birchard, Robert S. Cecil B. DeMille's Hollywood. Lexington: University Press of Kentucky, 2004. .
 Martin, Mick and Marsha Porter. Video Movie Guide. New York: Ballantine Books, 1997. .
 Meyer, Jeffrey. Gary Cooper: American Hero. New York: William Morrow, 1998. .
 Moses, Robert. AMC Classic Movie Companion. New York: Hyperion, 1999. .
 Swindell, Larry. The Last Hero: A Biography of Gary Cooper. New York: Doubleday, 1980.

External links
 
 
 
 North West Mounted Police on Lux Radio Theater: April 13, 1942
Signed script for North West Mounted Police, MSS 8833 at the Harold B. Lee Library, Brigham Young University

1940 films
1940 Western (genre) films
American adventure films
Films about rebellions
Adventure films based on actual events
Northern (genre) films
Films whose editor won the Best Film Editing Academy Award
Paramount Pictures films
Films directed by Cecil B. DeMille
Films scored by Victor Young
Royal Canadian Mounted Police in fiction
North-West Rebellion
Films set in 1885
Cultural depictions of Louis Riel
American Western (genre) films
Films shot in California
Films shot in Oregon
1940s English-language films
1940s American films